= Guy-Marie Sallier =

Guy-Marie Sallier, known in French as Sallier-Chaumont de la Roche, is a prominent figure in the history of France during the time of the French Revolution. Sallier was a magistrate for the Parlement of Paris. Sallier is the author of Annales Francoises, published in 1813, which is an encyclopedia written in response to the events that happened during the French Revolution. Although little is known about Sallier himself, his book is cited often in reference to events during the Ancien régime. Sallier wrote Recollections of a Parlementary Magistrate a retrospective account of the events that happened during the critical year of 1788.
